The Prince and the Coward (Polish: Książę i Tchórz) is a 1998 video game created by fantasy writer Jacek Piekara and video game designer Adrian Chmielarz. It was produced by Polish company Metropolis Software in cooperation with the British Revolution Software. A non-official translation in English was released in 2020, and GOG.com re-released it in 2021.

Plot 
In a fantasy kingdom, a young boy makes a deal with a devil to become a prince. The devil, however, puts his soul in the body of local prince Galador during a duel with a black knight. The boy runs away and hides in the cemetery, where he meets the wizard Arhivald. With his help "Galador" must find his way to hell and reverse his condition.

Gameplay 
The title is a 2D point-and-click adventure game. The game is mouse-controlled. When clicking on an item a series of possible interactions appears for the player to choose from.

Critical reception 
Galadhor of Przygodoskop called it the best Polish adventure game, praising its humour and wit. Michal Necasek of Just Adventure praised the "unusual, convoluted and interesting", while also complimenting its puzzles.

Benchmark included it in a list of the 100 best games of the twentieth century.

References 

Adventure games
1998 video games
ScummVM-supported games
Video games developed in Poland
Windows games
Windows-only games
Metropolis Software games